Bright Food (officially Bright Food (Group) Co., Ltd.) is a multinational food and beverages manufacturing company headquartered in Shanghai, China. It is the second-largest China-based food manufacturing company measured by 2011 revenues. The company is wholly owned by the Shanghai Municipal Government via Shanghai Municipal Investment Group and another sister company.

Bright Food has four listed subsidiaries. Bright Dairy & Food Co., Ltd., Shanghai First Provisions Store Co., Ltd., Shanghai Maling Aquarius Co., Ltd. and Shanghai Haibo Co., Ltd.

History 
In 1954, Songjiang Division Office decided to build a farm on the seashore of Fengxian. In 1959, Shanghai Municipality also decided to build farms on Chongming Island. At the time of 1960, 16 farms are built on the beach in Fengxian County and on Chongming and Changxing Islands. To administrate these farms, Shanghai Agricultural Reclamation Administration was set up in 1963 and was renamed to Shanghai Farm Administration() in 1970. During this time, Huangshan Tea and Forest Farm and Lianjiang Farm was established in Anhui. In 1973, Shanghai Municipal Shanghai Farm() was officially established in Dafeng, Jiangsu as an exclave. In 1980, Shanghai Municipality decided to establish the Shanghai Agricultural Reclamation and Industrial and Commercial Joint Enterprise Corporation(), which is the another brand (一个机构、两块牌子) of the Farm Administration. In 1994, the Farm administration was officially transformed into a company, Shanghai Agricultural Industry and Commerce (Group) Corporation(), and the brand of Farm administration was reserved for transition period proposes. In 2004, the group was renamed to Shanghai NGS (Group) Co., Ltd.(), a state-own limited company. In 2006, With , the holder of the Bright brand, Shanghai Sugar Industry Tobacco and Alcohol Group and some subsidiaries of Jinjiang International merged, a new food group was established and NGS Group was renamed to Bright Food (Group) Co., Ltd.

Investments 
In July 2010 Bright Food agreed to acquire a 51% stake in the New Zealand-based dairy producer Synlait for US$58 million.  However, as of September
2015, Bright Foods hold a 39.12% stake in Synlait.

In September 2010 Bright Food entered into exclusive discussions for the acquisition of the British snack food manufacturer United Biscuits, but the talks did not result in an acquisition.

In August 2011 Bright Food agreed to acquire a 75% stake in the Australia-based food producer Manassen Foods for A$530 million.

In May 2012 Bright Food agreed to acquire a 60% stake in the British breakfast cereals manufacturer Weetabix Limited in a £1.2 billion deal. This majority stake is set to be sold to US company Post Holdings for US$1.8 billion as of 18 April 2017.

In May 2014, Bright Food agreed to acquire a 56% stake in the Israeli Dairy producer Tnuva for the sum of US$2.5 Billion.

In October 2014 Bright Food agreed to acquire a majority stake in Italian olive oil producer Salov, which includes the Filippo Berio and Sagra Brands.

In September 2015, Bright Foods expressed interest in New Zealand dairy and meat company Silver Fern Farms by initiating a $100 million buyout of 50% of SFF. On 15 September, it was reported by The New Zealand Herald that Bright Foods subsidiary Shanghai Maling Aquarius Co., Ltd, had reached a $NZ261 Million deal to acquire 50% of Silver Fern Farms.

Products
Bright Food's products include:
Guangming (Bright) dairy products, 
Guansheyuan foodstuffs, 
Da Bai Tu (Big White Rabbit) candy,
Maling canned foods,
Bright ice cream products,
Aquarius water, 
Shikumen rice wine, 
Yutang sugar, 
Tip Top pickled foods,
Haifeng rice,
Aiseng pork,
Daying duck meat products, and
Shengfeng chocolate.

Market share
In 2010 Bright Food had a 5.7% share of China's dairy products market, ranking fourth. In the same year it had a 1.4% market share in the Chinese packaged foods market and a 1.6% share of the Chinese ice cream market.

See also
Hangzhou Wahaha Group

References

Further reading

External links
 Bright Food

Chinese companies established in 2006
Manufacturing companies based in Shanghai
Food manufacturers of China
Food and drink companies established in 2006